Litholomia, known commonly as the false pinion moth, is a genus of cutworm or dart moths in the family Noctuidae. There are at least four described species in Litholomia, found in the holarctic.

Species
These four species belong to the genus Litholomia:
 Litholomia gansuana (Kononenko, 2009)  (Asia)
 Litholomia napaea (Morrison, 1874) (false pinion moth)  (North America)
 Litholomia pacifica (Kononenko, 1978)  (east Asia)
 Litholomia umbrifasciata (Kononenko, 2009)

References

Natural History Museum Lepidoptera genus database
Litholomia at funet

Cuculliinae